Rurikovo Gorodische, the primary settlement in the area known in Scandinavian sources as Holmgård, was the 9th century predecessor of Veliky Novgorod.  The archaeological site is 2 km to the south of the current city center, across from Yuriev Monastery where the Volkhov River flows out of Lake Ilmen. Part of the Novgorod World Heritage site, it includes the original residence of the princes of Novgorod, connected with the names of many famous political figures of ancient Russia.

History
Settlement begins with fortress 8th century, built by Ilmen Slavs and which had a wooden wall on the shaft. 
Until the 19th century the tract, as well as the adjacent village was called simply Gorodische. The word Rurikovo was added at the beginning of the 19th century, influenced by legends which identify this place with the capital of the state of Rurik.

In 1999 a decision of the Novgorod Oblast Duma, the region's parliament (Resolution number 261-OD "On Amendments to the city limits of the city of Novgorod") "Rurik Settlement" is a feature of the city of Veliky Novgorod, but a small part of an archaeological site (including the cemetery) was a Volotovsky rural settlement area, there were proposals to the exclusion of the territory from the Volotovsky rural settlement and Novgorod municipal district and the incorporation of the territory of the municipality - "Borough of Novgorod the Great", in connection with the ability to produce about 300 million rubles for the improvement of Rurik settlement. Past public hearings have not solved this issue, but October 28, 2009 City Council Novgorod region has made changes to several laws that allowed this situation - the land of historical and cultural heritage, "Rurik settlement" will go to the territory of "urban district Novgorod".

See also

 Peryn

References

  E. N. Nosov: Research about the settlement
 Research about the settlement of Gorodishche (in Russian)

Archaeological sites in Russia
Geography of Novgorod Oblast
Rus' settlements
Cultural heritage monuments of federal significance in Novgorod Oblast